Heather O'Donnell is an American classical pianist and psychologist living in Düsseldorf, Germany.

Life 
O'Donnell was born in Summit, New Jersey in 1973. She began studying piano at the age of five, her most influential teachers were Charles Milgrim, Stephen Drury and Peter Serkin. She also worked closely with Yvonne Loriod, Emanuel Ax, and Claude Helffer. O'Donnell studied at New England Conservatory and Mannes College of Music, and took several courses in Philosophy and Literature at the New School for Social Research and Columbia University, and was the teaching assistant of philosopher Paul Edwards at the New School for Social Research.

Career 
O'Donnell plays works from the 18th-21st century, e.g. J.S. Bach's Goldberg Variations, Charles Ives's- Concord Sonata, and Maurice Ravel's Gaspard de la Nuit). She gave premieres of solo piano works (including pieces by Luciano Berio, Walter Zimmermann, James Tenney, Michael Finnissy, Frederic Rzewski, and Oliver Schneller). She has a strong affinity for the music of American composer Charles Ives, and has played and recorded his piano works extensively. She was the artistic director of commissioning projects including "Responses to Ives" and "Piano optophonique".

Since 2015, O'Donnell has been active as a psychologist (B.Sc. Psychology, M.Sc. Prevention and Health Psychology) and works with musicians and other performing artists on psychological blockages, injury prevention and rehabilitation, and other health-related issues.

In 2020 she founded The Green Room in Cologne, Germany.

References

External links
 Heather O'Donnell's website
 TGR The Green Room
 Program at Berliner Festspiele's MaerzMusik Festival

American classical pianists
American women classical pianists
1973 births
Living people
Columbia University alumni
People from New Jersey
The New School alumni
The New School faculty
21st-century American women pianists
21st-century classical pianists
21st-century American pianists
American women academics